Kanninun Cirutampu, also rendered Kaṇṇinuṇ Siṟuttāmbu, refers to a Tamil work of Hindu literature composed by Madhurakavi Alvar, one of the twelve Alvars, the poet-saints of the Sri Vaishnava tradition. Comprising eleven pasurams (hymns), the Kanninun Cirutampu is a tribute to Madhurakavi's acharya, Nammalvar. These hymns are part of the Sri Vaishnava canon, the Naalayira Divya Prabandham.

Legend 

The Kanninun Cirutampu is associated with the origin of the Naalayira Divya Prabandham. According to legend, the theologian Nathamuni once heard some people reciting the cantos of Āravāmude of Nammalvar at Kumbakonam. Captivated by these pasurams (hymns), he wanted to know more about them. One of the verses also mentioned Āyiraththul Ippaththu (Tamil: these 10 out of the 1000). When Nathamuni enquired about the remaining 990, the people who sang the 10 did not know anything about the other verses. But as the song mentioned the name and place of the Alvar (Kurugoor Satakopan), Nathamuni proceeded to Thirukurugoor and asked the people there about Nammalvar's 1,000 verses.[8]

The people did not know the 1,000 verses that Nathamuni wanted, but they told him about 11 pasurams (hymns) of Madhurakavi Alvar, a disciple of Nammalvar, and the Kanninun Cirutampu. They asked him to go to Thiruppulialvar, the place where Nammalvar lived, and recite these 11 pasurams 12,000 times. Nathamuni did as advised, and pleased with his penance, Nammalvar granted him not only his 1,000 pasurams, but the entire 4,000-pasuram collection of all the Alvars.[9]

Hymns 
The work is named after the opening two words of the first hymn. This is likely a metaphor that compares the knots that were tied by Yashoda to bound the baby Krishna to prevent him from stealing butter, and the poet's own strong ties with his preceptor, Nammalvar. He lauds his preceptor as the lord of Kurukur, the town where the latter resides.

The first hymn of the work is translated as follows:

See also 

 Periyalvar Tirumoli
 Tiruchanda Viruttam
 Nachiyar Tirumoli

References 

Naalayira Divya Prabandham

External links 
Mudalayiram - K. R. KrishnaSwami
Vaishnava texts
Tamil Hindu literature